Immortal is the third studio album by American rapper Tim Dog released in 2003.

Track listing
 Intro
 Dog Shit
 You Don't Know Me
 Hustluz
 The Professional
 Bring It
 It Ain't Funny
 Makin' Love written and performed by Ty Howard aka Tye Murda
 Make It Last
 Can I Live
 Get Out Da' Life
 Sun Don't Shine
 Pop Life
 We Can Grow
 Immortal

2003 albums
Tim Dog albums